Sri Sathya Sai district is a district in the Indian state of Andhra Pradesh. Its headquarters is at Puttaparthi. It was formed on 4 April 2022 from the Dharmavaram, Penukonda, Kadiri revenue divisions and a new Puttaparthi revenue division, with all three carved out of Anantapur district. The district is named after Sathya Sai Baba.

Geography
This district is bounded by North of Anantapur district, East by Annamayya district and YSR district And West by Chitradurga district of Karnataka and Tumakuru district of Karnataka , South by Chikkaballapura district in Karnataka State.

Etymology 
This district is named after Indian Guru Sri Sathya Sai Baba.

Demographics 

At the time of the 2011 census, the district had a population of 1,840,043 of which 392,357 (21.32%) lives in urban areas. Sri Sathyasai district has a sex ratio of 975 females per 1000 males. Scheduled Castes and Scheduled Tribes make up 2,48,993 (13.53%) and 83,966 (4.56%) of the population respectively.

At the time of the 2011 census, 78.47% of the population spoke Telugu, 11.03% Urdu, 7.08% Kannada and 2.67% Lambadi as their first language.

Administrative divisions 

The district has four revenue divisions, namely Dharmavaram, Kadiri, Puttaparthi and Penukonda, each headed by a sub collector. These revenue divisions are divided into 32 mandals. The district consists of four municipalities, Hindupuram, Kadiri, Puttaparthi and Dharmavaram.

Mandals 

There are 12 mandals in Penukonda division, 6 mandals in Puttaparthi division and 7 mandals each in Dharmavaram and Kadiri divisions. The 32 mandals under their revenue divisions are listed below:

Cities and towns

Politics 

There are one parliamentary and six assembly constituencies in Sri Sathya Sai district. The parliamentary constituencies are:

The assembly constituencies are:

Notable people 

 Sathya Sai Baba, Indian guru

References 

Districts of Andhra Pradesh
2022 establishments in Andhra Pradesh